Compulsory sterilization in Canada has a documented history in the provinces of Alberta, Saskatchewan, and British Columbia. In 2017, sixty indigenous women in Saskatchewan sued the provincial government, claiming they had been forced to accept sterilization before seeing their newborn babies.

Canadian compulsory sterilization operated via institutionalization, judgement, and surgery, similar to other nations at the time.

History of eugenics in Canada 
Eugenics movements appeared in many European and American jurisdictions in response to historical, social, scientific, economic, and political processes occurring at the time. Francis Galton invented the term "eugenics" in 1883, building it from its Greek roots meaning "good in birth" or "noble in heredity". "The science of eugenics was concerned with the improvement of the human standard and focused on the influence that would give 'the more suitable races or strain of blood a better chance of prevailing speedily over the less suitable'". Eugenicists were concerned with managing the direction human evolution would take: natural selection, about which Galton's cousin Charles Darwin wrote, was insufficient to deal with the needs of modern society. If left solely to nature, eugenicists argued, the dangerous classes who were thought to have a high-volume reproductive rate would take over; ideas, promoted abroad, were quick to gain popularity in Canada in the early 1900s. Nova Scotia, in 1908, was home of the first "eugenics movement" in the country when the League for the Care and Protection of Feebleminded Persons was established in the province. In Quebec, Ontario, and elsewhere, academics and physicians worked to enlist hereditarians to their ranks and publicly supported eugenics.

Eugenicists sought to actively support the reproduction of some women while at the same time seeking to ensure their cooperation in efforts to curb the reproduction of others through their support for measures like marriage regulation, institutionalization and sterilization. Many eugenicists were prepared to support certain rights for some women to the extent that these would help support the political and economic enterprise of nation building based on an inherently racial notion of who belonged.

Ideology worked to conceal the historical and material relations that gave rise to many of the social problems of Canadian society in the late nineteenth and early twentieth centuries by locating the causes of poverty, crime and illness within individuals. Adoption of proposed interventions like sterilization served as a cost-effective public health solution allowing systemic explanations to be avoided, private interests to benefit and exploitative relations to continue. In their efforts, eugenicists also encouraged the reproduction of the "fit", namely women of Anglo-Saxon, middle- and upper-class origins. Fearing a decrease in the birth rate due to their increased access to education, the achievement of work outside the home and rising infant mortality rates, eugenicists sought to bring these women "back home" by enticing them to become crusaders to the eugenic cause.

United Nations Convention for the Prevention and Punishment of the Crime of Genocide 
Article II of the United Nations Convention for the Prevention and Punishment of the Crime of Genocide defines genocide as any of the following acts committed with the intent to destroy in whole or in part a national, ethnic, racial, or religious group as such:

a) Killing members of the group;

b) Causing serious bodily or mental harm to members of the group;

c) Deliberately inflicting on the group conditions of life calculated to bring about its physical destruction in whole or in part;

d) Imposing measures to prevent births within the group;

e) Forcibly transferring children from one group to another.

An international conference of The United Nations Human Rights Commission, held in Montreal, stated in March, 1999 that Canada "is in violation of international law in its treatment of its aboriginal people" and that the condition of natives in Canada is "the most pressing human rights issue facing Canadians." (The Vancouver Sun, April 10, 1999).

Alberta

The most damaging sterilization program in Canadian history was afforded via the passing of the Sexual Sterilization Act of 1928. From the years 1928 to 1972, sterilizations, both compulsory and optional, were performed on nearly 3000 individuals of varying ages and ethnicities. In total, over 2800 procedures were performed. Initially, the act only provisioned sterilizations where consent was given by the subject or legal guardian of the subject, depending on the competency of the individual scheduled to undergo the operation. The 1937 amendment to the act allowed for sterilizations to be carried out without consent in the case of those deemed mentally defective. Sterilization of individuals deemed mentally ill still required consent. At the end of World War II, while other eugenic sterilization programs were being phased out, Alberta continued on, even increasing the scope of eligibility for sterilizations. They continued until 1972, when approximately 50 people were operated upon.

Targeted sterilization
Youths, minorities, and women were sterilized in disproportionately high numbers. Minors, because of their legal dependency on adults, were almost always assigned as "mental defectives", thus bypassing the parental consent requirement. Albertan Aboriginal people and Métis, regardless of age, were also targeted. Aboriginal people represented only 2.3% of the general population in Alberta, but made up 6% of the institutionalized population. Towards the end of Alberta's sterilization program, Aboriginal people and Métis made up 25% of the sterilizations performed. Furthermore, those of Aboriginal ancestry were disproportionately assigned the "mentally deficient" rating, which denied them their legal rights and made them eligible for sterilization without consent. Women, particularly women who were young, poor, and unmarried, were also disproportionately represented; they were thought to be at high risk for prostitution or at the very least promiscuity, activities suspected of breeding further immorality. While it was conceded that sterilization would not change the behavior of these women, sterilization was intended to prevent them from bearing similarly defective progeny.

Aftermath
Despite the inaccuracy of IQ testing  and the tremendous grey area in classifying the mentally defective, nearly 3000 people were rendered sterile by the Sexual Sterilization Act. The true nature of the Act was revealed when Leilani Muir, a former inmate of the Michener Centre (also known as the Provincial Training School for Mental Defectives, PTS), discovered in 1971 that she had been sterilized. After being admitted to the PTS at age 10 as an unwanted and abused child, Leilani was given a substandard education. She was inaccurately designated a mentally defective moron (an individual with an IQ between 51 and 70), effectively nullifying her human rights. She was administered powerful antipsychotic agents without any due cause, as she had not manifested any symptoms of psychosis during her incarceration at the PTS. Eventually she was given an impromptu IQ test, on which she scored a 64. Shortly thereafter, she was taken before the Eugenics Board, and sterilization was authorized pending her mother's consent (which was readily given).

In 1995, in damages for her humiliation at being labeled a moron and her subsequent sterilization, Leilani was awarded C$750,000 and C$230,000 (together $ in  dollars). Since the victory, another 1300 cases have been opened, several of them concerning individuals who may have actual mental disabilities.

British Columbia
In 1933 British Columbia became one of two provinces to implement a clear eugenic sexual sterilization law. The province's Sexual Sterilization Act, legislated in 1933 and repealed in 1973, closely resembled Alberta's 1928 legislation, although the practices differed. The Act created a Board of Eugenics, consisting of a judge, psychiatrist, and social worker. The Board was granted the authority to order the sterilization, with consent, of any inmate recommended to them by a superintendent, who "if discharged ... without being subjected to an operation for sexual sterilization would be likely to produce or bear children who by reason of inheritance would have a tendency to serious mental disease or mental deficiency". Many of the individuals presented for sterilization under the province's eugenics program came through Riverview Hospital (Essondale). In comparison to the "2834 individuals sterilized under Alberta's eugenic policy, historian Angus McLaren has estimated that in British Columbia no more than a few hundred individuals were sterilized".[2] The disparity between the numbers sterilized in the two provinces can be attributed in part to the tighter provisions of British Columbia's Sexual Sterilization Act. Whereas the Alberta legislation was amended twice to increase the program's scope and efficiency, British Columbia's sterilization program remained unchanged.[3] Although this appears to have settled the issue, in the early 1970s the public would learn that coercive sterilizations were in fact taking place in the North in spite of the lack of legislation.

Targeted peoples 
Concepts of race have long been connected to dealings with Aboriginal peoples in Canada. Eugenic ideology served as a convenient justification for the terrible circumstances created by colonization and was instrumental in determining how to interfere in the lives of Aboriginal peoples. Interventions were often guided by the view that the less progressed were a hazard to society and this justified drastic invasions in their lives. Initial measures advocated in the spirit of negative eugenics including marriage regulation, segregation and sterilization were all imposed on Aboriginal peoples.

Policy 
The Canadian sterilization laws created a Eugenics Board that could impose sterilizations on people without their consent. This developed into a familiar practice, especially in relation to indigenous men, women and children.

In 1926 Dr. Adolf Lorenz of Vancouver stated, "our sense of humanity is destroying humanity. We are allowing more and more of the poorer human stock to survive and reproduce. '' Sterilization was the best method to decrease the number of feeble-minded being produced. Once the feeble-minded were sterilized and the "problem cured."

In order to conclude who was a potential candidate for sterilization or institutionalization, intelligence tests were being overseen in schools, hospitals, and boys and girls schools. Intelligence tests were initiated in California, which also had the most active eugenic policy in the United States. Members of the Legislative Assembly of British Columbia, such as the "Honourable William Sloan", stated California was the leader in developing and carrying out a eugenics act.

In accordance with the Act, only people who were a "patient or in custody" of an institution as defined by the "Mental Hospitals Act" or the "Industrial Home for Girls" or the "industrial School Act" would be affected by the Act. ''These individuals, termed by the Act as "inmates", would be involved or living in Essondale (now known as Riverview Psychiatric Institution), or the Boys' or Girls' Industrial Schools (for children deemed delinquent).

Decisions as to which inmates would be sterilized were to be made by the Board of Eugenics. The Board of Eugenics consisted of a judge, a psychiatrist, and a social worker who were appointed by the Lieutenant Governor in Council. The Board of Eugenics would receive recommendations from one of the above institutions if the superintendent of the institution believed that the release of an inmate would result "by reason of inheritance" in having children who would have "serious mental disease or mental deficiency.'' The recommendations were to be in writing and were to include a history of the inmate to support the institution's recommendation for sexual sterilization. The inmate may, there after, be examined or seen by the Board of Eugenics.

If after the examination of the inmate the Board of Eugenics unanimously agreed that this person would be likely to produce children who would have a serious mental disease or mental deficiency due to inheritance, the Board of Eugenics could order, in writing, that the sterilization take place. The Board of Eugenics would or could appoint the doctor who would perform the procedure.

If the Board of Eugenics believed that the inmate was not capable of consent, a spouse, guardian, or family member would be requested give their for consent. If the inmate had no family, the Provincial Secretary, the predecessor of the Superintendent of the Ministry of Social Services, was to consent on the inmate's behalf.

Timeline
1867- Canadian Constitution Act gives federal parliament legislative authority over "Indians, and Lands reserved for Indians
1870- Canadian Residential Schools in operation
1872- Victoria Lunatic Asylum, British Columbia's first asylum for the insane opens.
1873- British Columbia passes the "Insane Asylums Act."
1876- Canada passes the "Indian Act"
1878- British Columbia's Victoria Asylum closed, and the Provincial Asylum for the Insane is opened in New Westminster.
1883- Work therapy introduced in British Columbia's asylums
1883- "Eugenics" coined by Galton
1897- British Columbia passes the "Hospitals for the Insane Act"
1897- New Westminster asylum is renamed the Provincial Hospital for the Insane (PHI)
1904- New mental hospital opened in Coquitlam, British Columbia
1925- British Columbia Royal Commission on Mental Hygiene report.
1927- Canadian Medical Association Journal publishes the editorial "Eugenics and the Medical Profession"
1928- George Godwin's Columbia, or the Future of Canada is published in the To-day and To-morrow Series
1933- British Columbia passes "An Act respecting Sexual Sterilization"
1945- Essondale Report released
1948- Convention on the Prevention and Punishment of Genocide
1950- British Columbia's Provincial Hospital for the Insane is renamed Woodlands School
1951- Canada amends the "Indian Act"
1964- British Columbia's Colquitz forensic psychiatric hospital closes
1973- British Columbia repeals the Sexual Sterilization Act
1982- Canadian Charter of Rights and Freedoms signed into law
1985- Following a nationwide trend in de-institutionalization, British Columbia closes Tranquille
1986- Valleyview Hospital in British Columbia closes
1988- British Columbia Mental Health Society is founded
1998- The Mental Health Initiative in British Columbia introduces a new plan for the development of mental health services
2002- British Columbia releases "The Need to Know: Administrative Review on Woodlands School"
2003- British Columbia Minister of Children and Family Development issues apology to former residents of Woodlands

Manitoba
Recent court discussions in Manitoba have investigated the legality and ethical permissibility of involuntary sterilization of the mentally disabled. Focusing on those individuals found legally incompetent, the 1990 and 1992 reports outlined the scenarios where an involuntary sterilization could be warranted.
As stated by the 1990 discussion, three conditions are necessary for an individual to undergo any medical procedure.
 The individual must be informed of both the nature, and risks/benefits of the procedure.
 The consent must be voluntary, not the product of coercion, threat, or fraud.
 The individual must be competent enough to give the above consent.

Individuals who are legally incompetent include minors and sufficiently-disabled adults.

The discussion reached a consensus that involuntary sterilization (or sterilization with substituted consent) is only permissible if it has an explicit positive effect on the physical or mental health of the individual: this is called therapeutic sterilization. One such case involved was a seriously disabled girl with an aversive phobia to blood, who was scheduled to undergo a hysterectomy. The rationale of the surgery was not eugenic, but rather to protect the girl from the direct mental trauma that would likely arise upon initiation of menses. This judgement was seen to be on the very threshold between therapeutic and nontherapeutic surgical intervention.

This discussion also cites a landmark case in substituted consent known as the Mrs. E. vs. Eve case. In it, a mother, "Mrs. E.", wished to have her moderately intellectually disabled daughter "Eve" sterilized to save her the emotional distress potentially caused by pregnancy and childbirth. Additionally, it was argued that Eve would neither be capable of using any other method of contraception, nor caring for a child should she become pregnant. Since the sterilization was not explicitly therapeutic and carried grave physical harm and an intrusion on Eve's rights, Mrs. E. could not be given the authority to have her daughter sterilized. It was then explored whether or not the government itself could make the decision, using parens patriae jurisdiction. Parens patriae allows the government to make authorizations in the "best interests" where no other source of consent can be attained; this includes children and mentally disabled persons. In the Eve case, the risks were deemed too high and the benefits too obscure to authorize a nontherapeutic sterilization via parens patriae jurisdiction, since a surgical sterilization is an irreversible procedure.

Ontario
Although eugenic sterilization was never instituted in Ontario, the issue saw considerable debate concurrent with the enactment of sterilization laws in Alberta and British Columbia. The formation of the Eugenics Society of Canada (ESC) in 1930 sought to organize supporters of eugenics into a coherent group in order to make their lobbying of the government more effective. Founded in Ontario, the ESC boasted a large number of physicians in its ranks, including Clarence Hincks, one of the most devoted proponents of the Alberta Sexual Sterilization Act. Other notable members included the Lieutenant-Governor of Ontario, Dr. H. A. Bruce, and eminent psychiatrist Clarence B. Farrar, who had been head of the Toronto Psychiatric Hospital since 1925. As social traits like criminality and promiscuity began to edge off the list of heritable traits, the ESC found itself adapting its strategy to that of birth control, while maintaining a focus on economic benefit. It garnered considerable support, but was never able to table eugenic sterilization effectively in the political arena. The ESC met its end shortly after a public relations blunder in 1938, when a representative implied the ESC and the Nazi party sought to achieve similar goals through similar means. It is not surprising then, that when World War II broke out in 1939, the ESC lost nearly all of its support.

See also
Eugenics
Eugenic feminism
Eugenics in the United States
Compulsory sterilization
Sterilization (medicine)

References

External links
Baron, Jeremy Hugh. The Anglo-American Biomedical Antecedents of Nazi Crimes. The Edwin Mellen Press: Lewiston, 2007.

Eugenics in Canada
Social history of Canada
Healthcare in Canada
Sterilization (medicine)
Compulsory sterilization